The 2018 South American Under-20 Women's Football Championship was the eighth edition of the South American Under-20 Women's Football Championship, the biennial international youth football championship organised by CONMEBOL for the women's under-20 national teams of South America. The tournament was held in Ecuador between 13 and 31 January 2018.

The top two teams of the tournament qualified for the 2018 FIFA U-20 Women's World Cup in France as the CONMEBOL representatives.

Brazil were crowned champions and maintained their streak of winning all eight editions so far.

Teams
All ten CONMEBOL member national teams are eligible to enter the tournament.

Venues
The matches were played in three venues in three cities.
Estadio Bellavista, Ambato
Estadio Olímpico de Ibarra, Ibarra
Estadio Olímpico de Riobamba, Riobamba

Draw
The draw of the tournament was held on 14 December 2017, 19:00 ECT (UTC−5), at the Casa de la Selección in Quito. The ten teams were drawn into two groups of five teams. The hosts Ecuador and the defending champions Brazil were seeded into Groups A and B respectively, while the remaining teams were placed into four "pairing pots" according to their results in the 2015 South American Under-20 Women's Football Championship: Venezuela–Colombia, Argentina–Chile, Paraguay–Uruguay, Bolivia–Peru.

Squads
Players born on or after 1 January 1998 are eligible to compete in the tournament. Each team could register a maximum of 22 players (three of whom must be goalkeepers).

Match officials
A total of 10 referees, 20 assistant referees, and two support referees were selected for the tournament.

First stage
In the first stage, the teams are ranked according to points (3 points for a win, 1 point for a draw, 0 points for a loss). If tied on points, tiebreakers are applied in the following order (Regulations Article 18.1):
Goal difference;
Goals scored;
Head-to-head result in games between tied teams;
Drawing of lots.

The top two teams of each group advance to the final stage.

All times are local, ECT (UTC−5).

Group A

Group B

Final stage
In the final stage, the teams are ranked according to points (3 points for a win, 1 point for a draw, 0 points for a loss). If tied on points, tiebreakers are applied in the following order, taking into account only matches in the final stage (Regulations Article 18.2):
Goal difference;
Goals scored;
Head-to-head result in games between tied teams;
Fair play points (first yellow card: minus 1 point; second yellow card / red card: minus 3 points; direct red card: minus 4 points; yellow card and direct red card: minus 5 points);
Drawing of lots.

Winners

Qualified teams for FIFA U-20 Women's World Cup
The following two teams from CONMEBOL qualified for the 2018 FIFA U-20 Women's World Cup.

1 Bold indicates champions for that year. Italic indicates hosts for that year.

Goalscorers
12 goals

 Geyse

10 goals

 Angie Castañeda

7 goals

 Jessica Martínez

5 goals

 Fabiola Sandoval

4 goals

 Brenda
 Lice Chamorro
 Deyna Castellanos

3 goals

 Juliana Berardo
 Kerolin
 Ignacia Vásquez
 Natalia Acuña
 Fanny Godoy

2 goals

 Ana Vitória
 Isabella
 Valéria
 Javiera Grez
 Isidora Olave
 Nelly Córdoba
 Maireth Pérez
 Dahiana Bogarín
 Esperanza Pizarro

1 goal

 Justina Morcillo
 Ariadina
 Juliana
 Thais Reiss
 Victória
 Ana Paola Andia
 Leonela Cruz
 Rosario Balmaceda
 Yastin Jiménez
 Vivian Acosta
 Laura Barreto
 Melissa Rivas
 Manuela Vanegas
 Marthina Aguirre
 Justin Cuadra
 Josselyn Espinales
 Luisa Espinoza
 Rosa Miño
 Jessica Sánchez
 Sandra Arévalo
 Esthefany Espino
 Michelle Paredes
 Karol Bermúdez

1 own goal

 Martha Andrada (playing against Brazil)

References

External links

Sudamericano Femenino Sub 20 Ecuador 2018, CONMEBOL.com

2018
2018 South American Under-20 Women's Football Championship
Under-20 Women's Football Championship
2018 in Ecuadorian football
2018 in women's association football
2018 in youth association football
January 2018 sports events in South America